Rómulo Rossi (1879–1945) was a Uruguayan politician, journalist and writer.

Works
Tasty old Montevideo Chronicles (1897)
Municipal Administration
Old memories and chronic (1922)
Historical episodes (Imp Peña Bros. 1923)
Memories and old chronicles vol. II (Imp Peña Bros. 1924 )
Memories and old chronicles vol. III (published in daily chronic Morning. Imp Peña Bros. 1928 )
Men and anecdotes (Imp Pena Brothers Bound in Col. Median Lafinur. 1928)
Revolution or Mutiny? Slopes and July 4, 1898. (Imp Commercial Gazette. 1932)
Tupambaé! The reconquest of the corpse of Colonel Knight (1935)
Old and new-style
Episodes Trojans
The story of the day
Santos and his times
From the heroic

References

1879 births
1945 deaths
People from Canelones, Uruguay
Uruguayan journalists
Colorado Party (Uruguay) politicians
Uruguayan male writers